Cytoglobin is the protein product of CYGB, a human and mammalian gene.

Cytoglobin is a globin molecule ubiquitously expressed in all tissues and most notably utilized in marine mammals. It was discovered in 2001 and named cytoglobin in 2002. It is thought to protect against hypoxia. The predicted function of cytoglobin is the transfer of oxygen from arterial blood to the brain.

Function 

Cytoglobin is a ubiquitously expressed hexacoordinate hemoglobin that may facilitate diffusion of oxygen through tissues, scavenge nitric oxide or reactive oxygen species, or serve a protective function during oxidative stress.

Applications 

CYGB expression can be used as a specific marker with which hepatic stellate cells can be distinguished from portal myofibroblasts in the damaged human liver.

References

Further reading

External links 
 

Hemoproteins